The Camden to Washington Road-Rosston Segment is a historic early 19th-century road section in rural Nevada County, Arkansas.  It is located east of Rosston in Poison Spring State Forest, and is a former portion of County Road 10 extending east from that road's junction with County Road 47 (Kirk Road).  The road was first cut c. 1825, and was never paved or given modern finishing, despite its continued use well into the 20th century.  A crossing at Cypress Creek has been compromised by the activities of beavers, and the road is no longer completely passable, possibly excepting high-clearance off-road vehicles.  The road section is the one of the only sections of the historic post road which connected Washington and Camden to retain its 19th-century character.

The road section was listed on the National Register of Historic Places in 2009.  The Carolina Methodist Church is located on this section of road.

See also
National Register of Historic Places listings in Nevada County, Arkansas

References

Roads on the National Register of Historic Places in Arkansas
Transportation in Nevada County, Arkansas
National Register of Historic Places in Nevada County, Arkansas
1825 establishments in Arkansas Territory
Transport infrastructure completed in 1825